Oripodoidea is a superfamily of oribatids in the order Oribatida. There are about 19 families and at least 1,300 described species in Oripodoidea.

Families
These 19 families belong to the superfamily Oripodoidea:

 Caloppiidae Balogh, 1960
 Drymobatidae J. & P. Balogh, 1984
 Haplozetidae Grandjean, 1936
 Hemileiidae J. & P. Balogh, 1984
 Liebstadiidae J. & P. Balogh, 1984
 Maudheimiidae J. & P. Balogh, 1984
 Mochlozetidae Grandjean, 1960
 Nasobatidae Balogh, 1972
 Neotrichozetidae Balogh, 1965
 Nesozetidae J. & P. Balogh, 1984
 Oribatulidae Thor, 1929
 Oripodidae Jacot, 1925
 Parapirnodidae Aoki & Ohkubo, 1974
 Pirnodidae Grandjean, 1956
 Protoribatidae J. & P. Balogh, 1984
 Pseudoppiidae Mahunka, 1975
 Scheloribatidae Jacot, 1935
 Symbioribatidae Aoki, 1966
 Tubulozetidae P. Balogh, 1989

References

Further reading

External links

 

Acariformes
Articles created by Qbugbot
Arachnid superfamilies